The Andrews-Bartlett Homestead is located in the village of Tuckerton Seaport on Main Street in Tuckerton in Ocean County, New Jersey near the Baymen's Museum.

The original section of the house was built  and is believed to be the oldest home in Ocean County, New Jesey. Mordecae Andrews built the original two-room home in 1699. Nathan Bartlett bought the house in 1824 and enlarged the entire structure, encompassing  the original portion in the center and actually completely surrounding it.

Partial funding for restoration of the building was in place as of 2017.

See also
Bartlett-Rockhill-Bartlett House
List of the oldest buildings in New Jersey
List of the oldest buildings in the United States
National Register of Historic Places listings in Ocean County, New Jersey
New Jersey Historic Trust

References 

Houses in Ocean County, New Jersey
Tuckerton, New Jersey
Houses completed in 1699